The Ontario U-21 Curling Championships (until 2016 called the Ontario Junior Curling Championships) is an annual curling tournament. It is the provincial curling championship for curling teams aged 20 and under in Southern Ontario. The winning team represents Ontario at the Canadian Junior Curling Championships.

Men's winners
Until 1978, the event was known as the provincial schoolboy championship. Since 1979, there have been two separate events.

Women's winners

Note

External links
U-21 Women - CurlON
U-21 Men - CurlON

Curling competitions in Canada
Curling in Ontario
Canadian Junior Curling Championships